Dendrobium unicum is a species of orchid, commonly known as the unique dendrobium endemic to Southeast Asia, in Thailand, Laos, and Vietnam.  It was first described by Seidenfadden in 1970.

Cultivation
Dendrobium unicum requires a cool climate with a temperature of

References

unicum
Orchids of Laos
Orchids of Thailand
Orchids of Vietnam
Flora of Indo-China
Plants described in 1970